Dysschema minor is a moth of the family Erebidae first described by Vitor Osmar Becker in 2013. It is found in Mexico.

The length of the forewings is 26–28 mm for males. The basal half of the forewings is smoky grey and the costa is grey, interrupted by smoky at the middle and before the apex. The costa of the hindwings is ochreous above the cell. The margins are orange.

Etymology
The species name is derived from Latin minor (meaning little).

References

Moths described in 2013
Dysschema